Hans Ernst Otto Christian von Rohr (1726–1778) was a Prussian officer during the Seven Years' War.

Biography
Rohr was born in Mecklenburg  in 1726. He joined the Prussian army in 1744 and was an ensign in 1750 and by 1771 had been promoted to major. In 1771 he was placed in command of the Carlowitz Infantry Battalion and distinguished himself in the Seven Years' War.

Notes

References
 

1726 births
1778 deaths
People from Mecklenburg
Prussian military personnel of the Seven Years' War